Gerald Monroe Rafshoon (born January 11, 1934) is an American television producer and political operative. He is one of the four founding members of Unity08, and was the White House Communications Director under the presidency of Jimmy Carter. In doing so, Rafshoon became the first professional advertising executive to join the White House staff.

In January 2008, Rafshoon and fellow Unity08 co-founder Doug Bailey left that organization to launch a national effort to draft New York City Mayor Michael Bloomberg to run for President of the United States as an independent candidate.

In 1976, Rafshoon was the architect of the advertising and public relations campaign that helped Carter, then a mostly unknown Southern governor and peanut farmer, become President of the United States.

Following his White House years, Rafshoon began producing motion pictures and television programs. He is a specialist in international co-productions working closely with the leading television networks and production companies in Europe and filming in Europe, the Middle East and Africa.

Television productions
He has produced 52 hours of television and cable entertainment for U.S. and international networks.  Among them are two Emmy Award-winning programs and three Emmy nominees. They include:

Circle of Violence starring Tuesday Weld, Geraldine Fitzgerald, and River Phoenix
The Atlanta Child Murders starring Morgan Freeman, Jason Robards, Rip Torn, Martin Sheen and James Earl Jones
The Nightmare Years starring Sam Waterston, the story of William L. Shirer and the Nazi Germany propaganda machine
Joseph starring Ben Kingsley and Martin Landau.  Winner of Emmy for Outstanding Miniseries.

Part of a series of eight films on the Old Testament for international television. Also including Abraham with Richard Harris, Moses, also starring Ben Kingsley, Samson and Delilah, Jacob, Solomon, and David.
Running Mates, a political comedy drama starring Tom Selleck, Laura Linney, Faye Dunaway, and Terry Hatcher.
Georgetown, a dramatic series for CBS starring Helen Mirren

He also produced an Emmy-winning documentary series Decisions That Shook the World, about important controversial decisions made by American presidents that defined their character and affected the course of history.

Television work 
According to Namebase, Gerald Rafshoon is mentioned in the following books:

 Greider's Secrets of the Temple 1989 (47)
 Hertsgaard's On Bended Knee 1988 (23, 38-9)
 Jones's The Politics of Money 1991 (215)
 Kilian & Sawislak's Who Runs Washington? 1982 (56)

References

External links
 
 Mr. Rafshoon's White House Exit Interview conducted by David Alsobrook of the Presidential Papers Staff.
 

|-

1934 births
American television producers
Living people
White House Communications Directors